

Skyway Fishing Pier State Park is a Florida State Park located on the north and south sides of the mouth of Tampa Bay. When the original cantilevered Sunshine Skyway Bridge, carrying I-275 (US 19), partially collapsed in 1980, due to the collision of a freighter on one of its pilings, it was replaced by the current bridges.  The approaches to the old bridge, however, were left in place and converted into the longest fishing pier in the world.

The most common activity on the pier is fishing. Common catches include snook, tarpon, grouper, black sea bass, Spanish mackerel, king mackerel, cobia, sheepshead, Mangrove Snapper, grunts, sharks, Goliath Grouper, Lane Snapper,  flounder, and many more. 

Other pier activities include site seeing and photography. 

Before the bridge are good flats to fish at, kite board, kayak, and wind surf.

Snacks, drinks, bait, and fishing supplies can be purchased on the pier, which has a fee for admission. The park is open 24 hours a day, 365 days a year.

Closing of eastern portion

In August 2008, Florida Department of Transportation officials announced that the eastern part of the pier would be closed on August 29, 2008, for safety reasons. Built in 1954, after 50 years of corrosion and wear and tear, it had worn out. The western portion, built 17 years later, were still deemed safe to use.

Gallery

References

External links

 Skyway Fishing Pier State Park at Florida State Parks
 Skyway Fishing Pier State Park at Wildernet

Parks in Manatee County, Florida
Parks in Hillsborough County, Florida
Tourist attractions in the Tampa Bay area
Piers in Florida
State parks of Florida
Protected areas established in 1994
1994 establishments in Florida